Kuwema (Kuwama) may refer to:
Tyaraity language
Kandjerramalh language